Racial nationalism is an ideology that advocates a racial definition of national identity. Racial nationalism seeks to preserve "racial purity" of a nation through policies such as banning race mixing and the immigration of other races. In order to create a justification for such policies, racial nationalism often promotes eugenics, and advocates political and legislative solutions based on eugenic and other racial theories.

Racial nationalism should not be confused with ethnic nationalism. A transitional form between racial and ethnic nationalism is also known as Völkisch nationalism.

See also
 Anti-immigration
 Black nationalism
 Ethnic nationalism
 Race (human categorization)
 Racism
 Separatism
 White nationalism
 White separatism

References

Sources
 

Racism
Ethnic nationalism
Politics and race